Rizvand-e Ali Akbar (also Romanized as Rīzvand-e ‘Alī Akbar; also known as Rīzehvand-e ‘Alī Akbar and Rīzvand-e Pā’īn) is a village in Beshiva Pataq Rural District, in the Central District of Sarpol-e Zahab County, Kermanshah Province, Iran. At the 2006 census, its population was 160, in 40 families.

References 

Populated places in Sarpol-e Zahab County